Mario Mazza (7 June 1882 - 22 November 1959) was an Italian educator.  In 1916 he was one of the founding members of ASCI (Italian: l'Associazione Scautistica Cattolica Italiana) which became The Scouts Association of Catholic Italians.

References

1882 births
1959 deaths
Italian educators